Cretoperipatus burmiticus is an extinct species of velvet worm that is known from Cretaceous Burmese amber approximately 100 million years old. It was found in Kachin state, Myanmar.

Taxonomy 
The species can be assigned to one of the modern families, the Peripatidae. While only five leg pairs can be discerned, the information gained from the fossil is enough to preclude assignment to any known modern genus.

Paleontology 
Cretoperipatus burmiticus is important in closing a gap between the only other known fossil onychophores, Helenodora inopinata from the Carboniferous and Succinipatopsis balticus plus Tertiapatus dominicanus from the Eocene and Miocene, respectively.

It was hypothesised that onychophorans could have migrated from Gondwana to Southeast Asia via the northwards drift of India. Research published in 2016 concluded that the age of Burmese amber supports an earlier migration through Europe. The same study also came to the conclusion that Typhloperipatus williamsoni is the closest extant relative of Cretoperipatus.

References

External links 
 

Prehistoric onychophorans
Late Cretaceous invertebrates
Cretaceous invertebrates of Asia
Onychophoran genera
Onychophorans of southeast Asia
Burmese amber
Fossil taxa described in 2002
Taxa named by Michael S. Engel
Cenomanian genera
Late Cretaceous animals of Asia
Monotypic protostome genera